Wislizenia refracta, common names jackass clover or spectacle fruit, is one of the three recognized species in its genus Wislizenia, which some authors consider subspecies. It is native to northwestern Mexico and the southwestern United States, particularly Chihuahua, Sonora, trans-Pecos Texas, New Mexico, Arizona, Utah, Nevada and California (Riverside, Kern and San Bernardino Counties). The species occurs in sandy flats, desert scrub and disturbed sites such as roadsides.

Its flowers are yellow.

References

Cleomaceae
Flora of the South-Central United States
Flora of the Southwestern United States
Flora of Mexico
Flora without expected TNC conservation status